Sarah Bosetti (born at 17 February 1984 in Aachen, West-Germany) is a German poet, author and satirical comedian.

Life 
Sarah Bosetti was born in Aachen, Germany, in 1984. Bosetti studied film-directing in Brussels. She graduated with a master's degree. Afterwards she traveled to Sardinia, Venice and Lisbon to live there for a few months. Then she moved to Berlin.

She first appeared on small cabaret stages with hand-made texts. She was awarded the Dieter Hildebrandt Prize in 2021. Since 2020 she has been doing the ZDF online format "Bosetti wants to talk!". She has regular guest appearances on TV-programs like extra3 (NDR), Die Anstalt (ZDF), ARD Ladies Night (WDR) and midnight peaks.

Bosetti is also producing radio-programs on a regular term for radioeins (RBB) and WDR 2. She also tours Germany with her solo program "I have nothing against women, you bitch!".

In her free time she is writing books.

Publications
"Ich hab nichts gegen Frauen, du Schlampe!". Mit Liebe gegen Hasskommentare. (I have nothing against women, you bitch! With love against hate speech.) 2020 rororo 
Ich bin sehr hübsch, das sieht man nur nicht so. Von einer die Auszog das Scheitern zu lernen. (I'm very pretty, you just don't see it that way. From someone who set out to learn how to fail.) 2019 rororo 
Mein schönstes Ferienbegräbnis (My favourite Holiday funeral). 2015 Voland & Quist 
Wenn ich eine Frau wäre (If I was a woman). 2014 Satyr Verlag

References

External links
 

German women comedians
German satirists
People from Aachen
1984 births
Living people